The Society of Black Archaeologists (SBA) is an international organization of Black archaeologists. The Society was founded in 2012. The founding board members are Drs. Justin Dunnavent, Ayana Omilade Flewellen, Jay Haigler, Alexandra Jones, and Cheryl LaRoche.

Mission
"The mission of the Society of Black Archaeologists (SBA) is to promote academic excellence and social responsibility by creating a space for Black archaeologists and other scholars who support SBA’s goals and activities".

Annual meeting
The first meeting of the Society of Black Archaeologists SBA took place at the annual meeting of the Society for Historical Archaeology (SHA) in Baltimore, Maryland in 2012. In 2019, SBA held its annual meeting at the 2019 Conference on Historical and Underwater Archaeology in St. Charles, Missouri.

External links
SBA official website
Society for Historical Archaeology—article on SBA

References

Archaeological professional associations
Archaeological organizations